The rough scallop, Aequipecten muscosus, grows up to . It has a small, scallop-shaped shell with about 20 strong ribs which have many erect scales or small spines near the margin. The hinge line has ears.

The coloration of the rough scallop shell varies from pink to a dark red exterior, often mottled with colors such as brown and cream, but it is also sometimes bright lemon-yellow or bright orange.

The habitat of this species is offshore, and the shell is found rarely on ocean beaches. This species inhabits ocean waters from North Carolina to the West Indies.

The rough scallop was frequently netted as incidental catch in commercial Atlantic calico scallop fishery.

References
 Phylum Mollusca
 Rough Scallop and NC Sea Grant

External links
 Southwest Florida Shells

Pectinidae
Bivalves described in 1828
Environmental impact of fishing